Miniature golf, also known as minigolf, mini-putt, crazy golf, or putt-putt, is an offshoot of the sport of golf focusing solely on the putting aspect of its parent game. The aim of the game is to score the lowest number of points. It is played on courses consisting of a series of holes (usually a multiple of 9) similar to its parent, but characterized by their short length (usually within 10 yards from tee to cup).

The game uses artificial putting surfaces (such as carpet, artificial turf, or concrete), a geometric layout often requiring non-traditional putting lines such as bank shots, and artificial obstacles such as tunnels, tubes, ramps, moving obstacles such as windmills, and walls of concrete, metal, or fiberglass. When miniature golf retains many of these characteristics but without the use of any props or obstacles, it is purely a mini version of its parent game.

Nomenclature
While the international sports organization World Minigolf Sport Federation (WMF) prefers to use the name "minigolf", the general public in different countries has also many other names for the game: miniature golf, mini-golf, midget golf, goofy golf, shorties, extreme golf, crazy golf, adventure golf, mini-putt, putter golf and so on. The name Putt-Putt is the trademark of an American company that builds and franchises miniature golf courses in addition to other family-oriented entertainment, and the term "putt-putt" is sometimes used colloquially to refer to the game itself. The term "minigolf" was formerly a registered trademark of a Swedish company that built its own patented type of minigolf courses.

History
Geometrically-shaped minigolf courses made of artificial materials (carpet) began to emerge during the early 20th century. The earliest documented mention of such a course is in the 8 June 1912 edition of The Illustrated London News, which introduces a minigolf course called Gofstacle.

The first standardized minigolf courses to enter commercial mass-production were the Thistle Dhu ("This'll Do") course 1916 in Pinehurst, North Carolina, and the 1927 Tom Thumb patent of Garnet Carter from Lookout Mountain, Tennessee. Thomas McCullough Fairbairn, a golf fanatic, revolutionized the game in 1922 with his formulation of a suitable artificial green—a mixture of cottonseed hulls, sand, oil, and dye. With this discovery, miniature golf became accessible everywhere; by the late 1920s there were over 150 rooftop courses in New York City alone and tens of thousands across the United States.  This American minigolf boom of early 20th century came to an end during the economic depression in the late 1930s. Nearly all minigolf courses in the United States were closed and demolished before the end of the 1930s.  A rare surviving example from this period is the Parkside Whispering Pines Miniature Golf Course located near Rochester, New York, and listed on the National Register of Historic Places in 2002.

The first miniature golf course in Canada was at the Maples Inn in Pointe-Claire, Quebec. The "Mapes" was constructed as a summer home in the 1890s but was renovated into a club in 1902, opened to the public in 1914, and had a miniature golf course in 1930. The popular nightspot burned in 1985. (See: West Island Chronicle, 29 June 2008.)

European origins

One of the first documented minigolf courses in mainland Europe was built in 1926 by Fr. Schröder in Hamburg, Germany. Mr. Schröder had been inspired by his visit to the United States, where he had seen minigolf courses spreading across the country.

In 1930 Edwin O. Norrman and Eskil Norman returned to Sweden from the United States, where they had stayed for several years and witnessed the golden days of the American minigolf boom. In 1931 they founded the company "Norman och Norrmans Miniatyrgolf" and began manufacturing standardized minigolf courses for the Swedish market. During the following years they spread this new leisure activity across Sweden, by installing minigolf courses in public parks and other suitable locations.

Swedish minigolf courses typically had a rectangular wooden frame surrounding the playing area made of tennis field sand (while the American manufacturers used newly developed and patented felt as the surface of their minigolf courses). Felt did not become popular as a surface material in Sweden until in the mid-1960s—but since then it has become practically the only surface material used in Scandinavia and Britain, due to its favorable playing qualities in wet weather. (Minigolf courses with a felt surface can be played in rainy weather, because water soaks through the felt into the ground. The other commonly used surface materials, beton and eternite, cannot be used in rainy weather, because the rainwater pools on them, stopping the ball from rolling.)

The Swedish Minigolf Federation (Svenska Bangolfförbundet) was founded in 1937, being the oldest minigolf sport organization in the world. National Swedish championships in minigolf have been played yearly since 1939. In other countries minigolf sport federations were not founded until the late 1950s, due to the post-war economical depression.

In 1954, the minigolf course in Ascona (Switzerland) opened, the oldest course worldwide following the norms of Paul Bongni.

Competitive games
The earliest documented minigolf competitions were played in the United States. The first National Tom Thumb Open minigolf tournament was arranged in 1930, with a total cash purse $10,000 (the top prize being $2,000). Qualification play-offs were played in all of the 48 states, and the final competition on Lookout Mountain, Chattanooga, Tennessee, attracted over 200 players representing thirty states. After the Depression ten years later, minigolf died out as a competition sport in America, and has begun to recover only during the most recent decades. The American minigolf sport boom of the 1930s inspired many European countries, and the sport of minigolf lived on in Europe even after the American game fell into Depression.

Post-depression U.S.

In 1938 Joseph and Robert Taylor from Binghamton, New York, started building and operating their own miniature golf courses. These courses differed from the ones in the late 20s and early 30s; they were no longer just rolls, banks, and curves, with an occasional pipe thrown in. Their courses not only had landscaping, but also obstacles, including windmills, castles, and wishing wells.

Impressed by the quality of the courses, many customers asked if the Taylors would build a course for them. By the early 1940s, Joe and Bob formed Taylor Brothers, and were in the business of building miniature golf courses and supplying obstacles to the industry. During both the Korean and Vietnam Wars, many a G.I. played on a Taylor Brothers prefabricated course that the U.S. Military had contracted to be built and shipped overseas. In the 1950s, Don Clayton invented the Putt-Putt brand with a focus on treating minigolf seriously, emphasizing skill and player improvement. Most of the Putt Putt routes were 2-par holes involving ramps or angled blocks that could be mastered in one go through practice.

By the late 50s almost all supply catalogs carried Taylor Brother's obstacles. In 1961 Bob Taylor, Don Clayton of Putt-Putt, and Frank Abramoff of Arnold Palmer Miniature Golf organized the first miniature golf association known as NAPCOMS (or the "National Association of Putting Course Operators, Manufacturers, and Suppliers"). Their first meeting was held in New York City. Though this organization only lasted a few years it was the first attempt to bring miniature golf operators together to promote miniature golf.

In 1955, Lomma Golf, Inc., founded by Al Lomma and his brother Ralph Lomma, led the revival of wacky, animated trick hazards. These hazards required both accurately aimed shots and split-second timing to avoid spinning windmill blades, revolving statuary, and other careening obstacles.

The book Tilting At Windmills (How I Learned To Stop Worrying And Love Sport) by Andy Miller tells the story of the formerly sports-hating author attempting to change by competing in miniature golf, including events in Denmark and Latvia.

In the United States, National Miniature Golf Day is held yearly on the second Saturday of May. The event had its inaugural celebration on 12 May 2007, and was officially recognized and published in 2008's edition of Chase's Calendar of Events.

Other countries
By the 1950s the American Putt-Putt company was exporting their minigolf courses to South Africa, Australia, Japan, Korea, India, Iran, Italy, Pakistan, Argentina, Brazil, and the Eastern Bloc.

Governing body

The sport of miniature golf is governed internationally by the World Minigolf Sport Federation (WMF), headquartered in Göteborg, Sweden. The WMF is a member of Global Association of International Sports Federations.  It organises World Championships for youth and elite players, and Continental Championships in Europe, Asia and the United States, held in alternate years.

WMF Members

Course types

All competitions approved by World Minigolfsport Federation are played on standardized courses, whose design has been checked to be suitable for competitive play. The WMF currently approves four different course types:
 Beton (abbreviated B, sometimes called "Bongni" and named after Paul Bongni of Geneva, Switzerland, "Minigolf" or "Abteilung 1")
 Eternite (abbreviated E (in Sweden EB), sometimes called "Europabana", "Miniaturgolf" or "Abteilung 2")
 Felt (abbreviated F or SFR, sometimes called "Swedish felt runs"), and
 Minigolf Open Standard (abbreviated "MOS"). The latter non-standardized playing system, MOS, covers all minigolf courses that the three standardized systems (B, E, F) do not cover.

The world record on one round of minigolf is 18 strokes on 18 holes. More than a thousand players have officially achieved this score on eternite. On other playing systems a perfect round of 18 holes-in-one is extremely rare, and has never been scored in an official national or international tournament. Unofficial 18-rounds on concrete and felt courses have been reported in Sweden.

The 18th and final holes of many miniature golf courses are designed to literally capture the ball, effectively preventing the player from playing additional rounds without purchasing another game.  This may be accomplished with a "drain" or trap-door hole setup that channels the ball to a lockbox.  One popular method of theming the 18th hole in the United States is to use a gated, ramped target area depicting the face of a clown; if the ball lands "in" the clown's nose, a bell might sound and the player would win a discount ticket for another game. Another method for capturing the ball incorporated by various adventure golf courses involves a tube that sucks and propels the ball with pressurised air to a collection area or another area of the course typically on a higher elevation.

Competitions
Nearly all European countries have an official national federation for promoting minigolf as a competition sport. The bi-annual European Championships attract competitors from more than twenty European countries. As of 2012, Chris Beattie has been the holder of the European Championship title. Outside Europe only a small number of countries have participated in international minigolf competitions. These countries include the United States, Japan, China, India and Taiwan. A national minigolf federation exists also in Moldova, Mexico, Australia and New Zealand, but none of these countries has ever participated in international competitions, and probably are not arranging many domestic competitions either.

World Minigolfsport Federation represents some 40,000 registered competition players from 37 countries. The national minigolf federation of Germany has 11,000 members with a competing license, and the Swedish federation has 8,000 registered competition players. Other strong minigolf countries include Austria and Switzerland, each having a few thousand licensed competition players. Also Italy, Czech Republic and Netherlands have traditionally been able to send a strong team to international championships, even if they cannot count their licensed players in thousands.

The sceptre of competitive minigolf rests quite firmly in mainland Europe: no player from other countries (such as UK, the United States, Japan et cetera) has ever reached even the top 50 in World Championships (in men's category). Nearly all national federations outside Europe were founded only quite recently (within the last ten years), and it will take time before the players of these countries learn all secrets of the game. The United States has a longer history of minigolf competitions, but the standardized European competition courses are practically unknown in the United States, and therefore the American players have been unable to learn the secrets of European minigolf. On the traditional American courses the best American players are able to challenge the European top players into a tough and exciting competition.

The British Minigolf Association (BMGA) has an additional problem on their way to greater success in competitive minigolf. While the minigolf federations in mainland Europe receive annual funding from the government, in England the national sports organisation Sport England has refused to accept BMGA as its member – which means that BMGA is left without the public funding that other forms of sports enjoy. The rules of Sport England declare that only one variant of each sport can be accepted as member – and minigolf is interpreted as a variant of golf.

The most prize money is paid in the United States, where the winner of a major competition may earn up to $5,000. In mainland Europe the prize money generally quite low, and in many cases honor is the only thing at stake in the competition. International championships usually award no prize money at all.

In the US there are two organizations offering national tournaments: the Professional Putters Association and the US Pro Mini-Golf Association (USPMGA). The USPMGA represents the United States in the World Minigolfsport Federation, having been an active member since 1995. USPMGA President Robert Detwiler is also the WMF representative for North and South America.

The New Israeli Minigolf Association was established in February 2010 in Israel. Setting up, for the first time, league play according to the rules of WMF and USPMGA. Now, a series of lush and inviting minigolf parks in prime locations are being built around Israel.

International

World Minigolfsport Federation (WMF), a member of AGFIS, organises World Championships biennially (on odd-numbered years), while the continental championships in Europe and Asia are organized on even-numbered years. Many of these competitions are arranged for three age groups: juniors (under 20 years), adults (no age limit), and seniors (over 45 years). Men and women compete separately in their own categories, except in some team competitions and pair competitions. The difference in the playing skills of men and women is very small at the top level. Sometimes the best player in a major international tournament is female. Typically the winner in women's category would be very close to medals also in men's category.

World and European Championships have so far never been arranged on MOS courses (which are popular in the United States and UK, and were approved by WMF for competition use only a few years ago). International competitions are typically arranged on two courses of 18 holes, of which one course is eternite, and the other course is usually concrete, less commonly felt. In the future, the WMF is expected to use also MOS courses in international championships – which will give American and British players a chance to show their skills on their own traditional course types.

The most prestigious MOS minigolf competitions in the world are the US Masters, US Open, British Open, World Crazy Golf Championships and the World Adventure Golf Masters.

See also
Clock golf
Défi mini-putt, a 1990s RDS televised minigolf series from Quebec
European Minigolf Sport Federation
M.C. Mini Masters, a unique annual amateur miniature golf tournament
Pitch and putt
Professional Putters Association
Sholf
Variations of golf
World Crazy Golf Championships

References

External links

 World records in minigolf
 WMF - World Minigolfsport Federation (WMF)
 History of miniature golf
 British Minigolf Association - British Minigolf Association

 
Forms of golf
Ball and bat games